The Passionate Friends is a 1922 British romantic drama film directed by Maurice Elvey and starring Milton Rosmer, Valia, and Fred Raynham. It is based on H.G. Wells' The Passionate Friends: A Novel (1913), which was adapted again by David Lean for his 1949 film The Passionate Friends.

Cast
 Milton Rosmer as Steven Stratton 
 Valia as Lady Mary Christian 
 Fred Raynham as Harrison Justin 
 Madge Stuart as Rachel Moore 
 Lawford Davidson as Guy Ladislaw 
 Ralph Forster as Philip Evesham 
 Teddy Arundell as Edward Stratton
 Annie Esmond as Maid

Production
The Passionate Friends was part of the Stoll Pictures' "Eminent Authors" series of films. Although based upon Wells' 1913 social realist novel, it largely avoided any of Wells' radical social commentary regarding the United Kingdom.

References

External links

1922 films
British silent feature films
1922 romantic drama films
1920s English-language films
Films directed by Maurice Elvey
Films based on British novels
Films based on works by H. G. Wells
British black-and-white films
British romantic drama films
Stoll Pictures films
1920s British films
Silent romantic drama films